HMS Beaufort was a  of the Royal Navy. She was laid down on 17 July 1940 at Cammell Laird, Birkenhead. She was launched on 9 June 1941 and commissioned on 3 November 1941. During the Second World War the ship served in the Mediterranean Sea, escorting convoys and covering landings. She was transferred to the Royal Norwegian Navy in 1952 and scrapped in 1965.

Construction and design
HMS Beaufort was one of 16 Type II Hunt-class destroyers ordered from various shipbuilders on 20 December 1939. The Hunts were meant to fill the Royal Navy's need for a large number of small destroyer-type vessels capable of both convoy escort and operations with the fleet. The Type II Hunts differed from the earlier ships in having increased beam in order to improve stability and carry the ships' originally intended armament.

Beaufort was laid down at Cammell-Laird's Birkenhead, shipyard on 17 July 1940 and was launched on 9 June 1941, and was completed on 3 November that year. Beaufort was the second ship of the Royal Navy to have that name, and was named after the Duke of Beaufort's Hunt. 

Displacement was  standard and   under full load.

The ship's main gun armament was six 4 inch (102 mm) QF Mk XVI dual purpose (anti-ship and anti-aircraft) guns in three twin mounts, with one mount forward and two aft. Additional close-in anti-aircraft armament was provided by a quadruple 2-pounder "pom-pom" mount and two single Oerlikon 20 mm cannon mounted in the bridge wings. Power-operated twin 20 mm Oerlikon mounts replaced the single Oerlikons during the war. Up to 110 depth charges could be carried. The ship had a complement of 168 officers and men.

Second World War service
After commissioning and work-up, Beaufort, commanded by Standish O'Grady Roche, was assigned to the 5th Destroyer Flotilla of the Mediterranean Fleet, arriving at the flotilla's base at Alexandria, Egypt in February 1942. On 12 February 1942, Beaufort left Alexandria as part of the escort of eight destroyers and one anti-aircraft cruiser for the three fast merchant ships of Malta-bound Convoy MW.9. The convoy came under air attack on 13 February, and one of the merchant ships,  was hit and damaged, and forced to divert to Tobruk. The next day, the merchant ship  was hit and sunk, while  was damaged and later scuttled. The next convoy from Egypt to Malta, Convoy MW.10, took place in March. The 5th Flotilla, including Beaufort, left Alexandria on 19 March on an anti-submarine sweep ahead of the main body of the convoy which left on 20 March. On 22 March Italian warships, including the battleship  and three heavy cruisers, attempted to attack, with the British deploying the cruisers and fleet destroyers against the surface threat, in the Second Battle of Sirte, while the Hunts of the 5th Flotilla remained with the convoy.

On 13 June 1942, another convoy set out for Malta from Egypt, under the codename Operation Vigorous, while at the same time, Operation Harpoon, the passage of another convoy from the west, sailed from Gibraltar. Beaufort formed part of the close escort for Vigorous. On the night of 11/12 July, Beaufort, together with Dulverton, Eridge and Hurworth, bombarded the Italian-held port of Mersa Matruh, with the four destroyers sinking the cargo ship , which had been driven out of harbour by an attack by Fleet Air Arm Fairey Albacore torpedo bombers.

In July 1943, Beaufort took part in the Allied invasion of Sicily, escorting an assault convoy to the beachhead as part of Escort Group P, while in September that year she supported the Allied landings at Salerno, on mainland Italy. In October 1943, Beaufort was deployed to the Aegean Sea for the Dodecanese Campaign, attempting unsuccessfully (with ) to intercept a German convoy on the night of 15/16 October. On the nights of 12/13 and 13/14 November 1943, the three destroyers failed to find German shipping carrying invasion forces to Leros, while on 12 November they bombarded German troops on Leros. Their efforts did not stop the German efforts, however, and Leros surrendered on 16 November. On 22 January 1944, Beaufort took part in the Allied landings at Anzio, Italy, and in August, Operation Dragoon, the Allied invasion of Southern France.

Postwar service
On 10 June 1945 Beaufort arrived in Cardiff from the Mediterranean for a refit, however this was abandoned and she was towed to Devonport and placed in reserve. In 1947, she was placed in Category C2 reserve, also known as "Extended Reserve", being kept in case of a future emergency, but requiring a major refit before re-entering service. In 1949, the Reserve Fleet was re-organised, with Beaufort classified as in Category C Reserve, but this was a similar type of Extended Reserve.

On 31 October 1951 Beaufort was loaned free of charge for a four-year period to the Royal Norwegian Navy, and after a refit, entered service with the new name Haugesund. In 1954 she was fitted with lattice masts and two Squid Anti-submarine mortars, in place of the 'X' gun turret on the aft of the ship. In 1956, Haugesund was sold outright to Norway. She was scrapped in 1965.

Notes

References

Publications
 
 
 
 
 
 
 
  
 
 
 
 
 
 

 

Hunt-class destroyers of the Royal Navy
Hunt-class destroyers of the Royal Norwegian Navy
Ships built on the River Mersey
1941 ships
World War II destroyers of the United Kingdom